Aqua Wing Arena is an indoor aquatics arena in Nagano, Japan. The closest station is Asahi Station on the Nagano Electric Railway, a distance of 1 km.

The Aqua Wing Arena was constructed as Venue B for the ice hockey events at the 1998 Winter Olympics, and was the last venue to be completed for the Games, in September 1997. Big Hat, the principal Venue A for the ice hockey competition at the 1998 Winter Olympics, is located approximately 5.3 km southwest of Aqua Wing Arena. M-Wave, the site of the speed skating events at the Games is located approximately 2.5 km south of Aqua Wing Arena.

The Aqua Wing Arena was designed to be converted into an aquatics centre, and the retrofit was completed in 1999. The arena consists of a 50-meter pool, a 25-meter swimming pools, and a diving pool. The roof is retractable. Although the arena sat 6,000 during the 1998 Winter Olympics, the civic pool currently seats 2,000 spectators. The Aqua Wing Arena will be an international pre-training camp for the 2020 Summer Olympics.

Construction and equipment

The design of Aqua Wing Arena includes sharp flowing lines which represent the wind and water of the region.  Its name, Aqua Wing derives from its similarity to a wing.  Its retractable roof is supported by V-shaped pillars.

Aqua Wing Arena was built on public land in Nagano Sports Park, as such land costs for the venue were nil; however, construction costs for the arena totaled 9.1 billion yen. The venue covers an area of approximately 5.2 ha. The permanent facilities include a building area of approximately 10,100m2, with total floor area of approximately 13,500m2. The building is made of reinforced concrete and steel frames, with three stories above ground and one below rground. The maximum height of the building is 31m.  In addition, 16 temporary structures covering 2,390m2 and providing 4,690m2 of floor space were built.

To build the ice for Aqua Wing Arena, a temporary rink was situated on top of the 50-meter pool and diving pool, with indirect ammonia refrigeration. The ice hockey rink was built to International Ice Hockey Federation standards, 60m x 30m. Sound dampening measurers were used because the ice hockey rink was built atop an empty space. The 25-meter pool was used for the sub press center. Aqua Wing Arena was the only venue at the 1998 Winter Olympics that did not stage international competitions before the Games. In lieu of international competitions, several Japan Ice Hockey League matches were held which permitted staff and volunteers to practice procedures.

Electricity for the Aqua Wing Arena during the games was generated by gas engines, and heat generated by the engines and freezing equipment was used as energy for the heating system. This system resulted in capturing 80% of the heat generated by the engines and freezing equipment. This system is used to heat the swimming pool.

Ice hockey at the Winter Olympics at Aqua Wing Arena
During the 1998 Winter Olympics, Aqua Wing Arena hosted a total of 15 games for the women's tournament and eight games for the men's tournament at the Winter Olympics, including two quarterfinal matches. The arena hosted 113,412 spectators over 10 days. Only Big Hat (256,306), Hakuba Ski Jumping Stadium (179,185), and M-Wave (118,555) hosted more spectators.

Women's tournament

1998 was the first year that women competed in Olympic hockey. Except for the bronze medal match and gold medal match which were held at Big Hat, all games of the women's tournament were played at Aqua Wing Arena. The table below displays the matches held at the Aqua Wing Arena.
All times are local (UTC+9).

Men's tournament

1998 was the first year that professional athletes from the North American National Hockey League competed in Olympic hockey. Most games in the men's tournament were held at Big Hat. The table below displays the matches held at the Aqua Wing Arena.

All times are local (UTC+9).

Public transportation
Asahi Station on the Nagano Electric Railway is approximately 15 minutes away by foot
Kita-Nagano Station on the Shinano Railway is approximately 15 minutes away by foot
Bus No.7 leaves from Nagano Station, passengers disembark at Undou kouen or Undou kouen higashi

References

Sports venues completed in 1997
Indoor arenas in Japan
Indoor ice hockey venues in Japan
Venues of the 1998 Winter Olympics
Olympic ice hockey venues
Sports venues in Nagano Prefecture
1997 establishments in Japan
Sport in Nagano (city)
Swimming venues in Japan